Czernihów (Chernihiv) Voivodeship was a unit of administrative division and local government in the Kingdom of Poland (part of Polish–Lithuanian Commonwealth) from 1635 until Khmelnytsky Uprising in 1648 (technically it existed up until 1654). Also it was used as a fictitious title in the Commonwealth until the Partitions of Poland in 1772/1795. In 1635, Marcin Kalinowski was the first voivode (governor) of the Chernihiv Voivodeship.

The voivodeship was part of the Lesser Poland Province of the Polish Crown, and was divided into two counties: Czernihow and Nowogrod Siewierski. Local sejmiks took place at Czernihow, and it had two senators in the Polish–Lithuanian Senate. Together with Kijow Voivodeship (Kyiv) and Bracław Voivodeship (Bratslav) it made the territory that came to be known as Ukraine.

History
The history of Czernihow Voivodeship dates back to 1618, when after the Truce of Deulino, the Commonwealth gained control of the towns of Smolensk, Czernihow and Nowogrod Siewierski. Since the truce was set to expire in 14.5 years, new acquisitions were not organized in official way. Smolensk was annexed by the Grand Duchy of Lithuania, while both Czernihow and Nowogrod became part of the Crown of the Kingdom of Poland forming the Duchy of Siveria. In 1633, during the Smolensk War, Polish Parliament (Sejm) introduced a bill in which both land court and starosta office were established at Czernihow. In 1634 the Treaty of Polyanovka confirmed that Czernihow remained part of Poland, so finally in 1635 the Sejm created the voivodeship, with two senators – the Voivode and the Castellan of Czernihow. Both county elected two deputies to the Sejm, and one deputy to the Lesser Poland Tribunal at Lublin. In 1637, construction of a fortress at Konotop began, whose purpose was to protect the newly acquired province. The fortress was completed in 1642.

The Commonwealth lost control of the province as early as 1648, during the Khmelnytsky Uprising. In the Treaty of Hadiach (1658), the Duchy of Ruthenia was created out of Czernihow Voivodship, Kiev Voivodeship and Bracław Voivodeship. The idea however was quickly abandoned, and after the Truce of Andrusovo (1667), Czernihow Voivodeship was annexed by the Tsardom of Russia.

The history of Czernihow Voivodeship does not end in 1667. Following the example of other provinces lost by the Commonwealth in the mid-17th century (e.g. Smolensk Voivodeship), the government in Warsaw continued to claim it as a titular voivodeship, with fictitious titles of voivode, senators, deputies and starostas named by the King, and remaining in use until the Partitions of Poland. The nobility of former Czernihow Voivodeship had its sejmiks at Wlodzimierz Wolynski. Last voivode of Czernihow was a man named Ludwik Wilga, nominated in 1783. In 1785, Stanisław August Poniatowski gave fictitious title of starosta of Nowogrod Siewierski to Tadeusz Czacki.

Zygmunt Gloger in his monumental book Historical Geography of the Lands of Old Poland gives a detailed description of Czernihow Voivodeship:

Voivodeship Governor (Wojewoda) seat: 
 Chernihiv

Administrative divisions:
 Chernihiv County
 Nowogród County

Voivodes
Marcin Kalinowski 1602–1652 
Stefan Bieniewski 1598–1648 
Krzysztof Łohojski-Tyszkiewicz 1616–1666 
Stanisław Kazimierz Bieniewski 1611–1695
Mariusz Stanisław Jaskólski 1624–1683
Jan Gniński 1650–1703 
Otto Fryderyk Felkerzamb 1641–1705 
Franciszek Jan Załuski 1660–1735
Mikołaj Franciszek Krosnowski 1652–1723 
Piotr Jan Potocki 1679–1726 
Józef Lubomirski 1680–1732
Józef Remigian Potulicki 1732–1734
Jakub Florian Narzymski 1690–1759
Piotr Michał Miączyński 1695–1776 
Franciszek Antoni Ledóchowski 1755–1835
Ludwik Wilga, died 1797

References

External links 

 Czernihow Voivodeship, description by Zygmunt Gloger
Central European Superpower, Henryk Litwin, BUM Magazine, October 2016.

 
Voivodeships of the Polish–Lithuanian Commonwealth
Geographic history of Ukraine
1635 establishments in the Polish–Lithuanian Commonwealth
1654 disestablishments in the Polish–Lithuanian Commonwealth
Early Modern history of Ukraine
History of Chernihiv Oblast